The 1947 Pittsburgh Pirates season was the 66th season of the Pittsburgh Pirates franchise; the 61st in the National League. The Pirates finished tied with the Philadelphia Phillies for eighth and last in the league standings with a record of 62–92.

Offseason 
 October 2, 1946: Steve Nagy was purchased by the Pirates from the Brooklyn Dodgers.
 Prior to 1947 season (exact date unknown)
Joe Muir was signed as an amateur free agent by the Pirates.
Tod Davis was returned by the Pirates to the Hollywood Stars after the expiration of their minor league working agreement.

Regular season 
 June 24: Against the Pirates, Jackie Robinson of the Brooklyn Dodgers stole home plate for the first time in his career. The Pirates catcher was Dixie Howell.

Season standings

Record vs. opponents

Game log

|- bgcolor="ccffcc"
| 1 || April 15 || @ Cubs || 1–0 || Sewell (1–0) || Borowy || — || 29,427 || 1–0
|- bgcolor="ccffcc"
| 2 || April 17 || @ Cubs || 7–1 || Roe (1–0) || Wyse || — || 9,749 || 2–0
|- bgcolor="ccffcc"
| 3 || April 18 || Reds || 12–11 || Ostermueller (1–0) || Beggs || Bonham (1) || 38,216 || 3–0
|- bgcolor="ccffcc"
| 4 || April 19 || Reds || 6–1 || Strincevich (1–0) || Lively || — || 21,891 || 4–0
|- bgcolor="ffbbbb"
| 5 || April 20 || Reds || 5–13 || Blackwell || Bahr (0–1) || — ||  || 4–1
|- bgcolor="ccffcc"
| 6 || April 20 || Reds || 7–3 (6) || Sewell (2–0) || Erautt || — || 40,784 || 5–1
|- bgcolor="ccffcc"
| 7 || April 23 || @ Cardinals || 8–5 || Bahr (1–1) || Burkhart || — || 6,832 || 6–1
|- bgcolor="ffbbbb"
| 8 || April 24 || Cubs || 5–6 || Borowy || Roe (1–1) || Kush || 6,889 || 6–2
|- bgcolor="ffbbbb"
| 9 || April 26 || @ Reds || 2–3 || Gumbert || Nagy (0–1) || — || 11,316 || 6–3
|- bgcolor="ffbbbb"
| 10 || April 27 || @ Reds || 1–6 || Walters || Sewell (2–1) || — ||  || 6–4
|- bgcolor="ffbbbb"
| 11 || April 27 || @ Reds || 1–2 (12) || Hetki || Ostermueller (1–1) || — || 36,961 || 6–5
|- bgcolor="ccffcc"
| 12 || April 29 || @ Phillies || 6–2 || Bahr (2–1) || Raffensberger || — || 7,386 || 7–5
|- bgcolor="ccffcc"
| 13 || April 30 || @ Phillies || 11–4 || Bonham (1–0) || Hughes || — || 6,576 || 8–5
|-

|- bgcolor="ffbbbb"
| 14 || May 6 || @ Braves || 0–6 || Sain || Higbe (0–1) || — || 29,631 || 8–6
|- bgcolor="ffbbbb"
| 15 || May 7 || @ Braves || 2–3 || Karl || Behrman (0–1) || — || 11,175 || 8–7
|- bgcolor="ffbbbb"
| 16 || May 8 || @ Braves || 5–12 || Beazley || Strincevich (1–1) || — || 4,560 || 8–8
|- bgcolor="ccffcc"
| 17 || May 10 || Cardinals || 3–0 || Ostermueller (2–1) || Dickson || — || 12,579 || 9–8
|- bgcolor="ffbbbb"
| 18 || May 11 || Cardinals || 6–10 (10) || Hearn || Nagy (0–2) || — ||  || 9–9
|- bgcolor="ffffff"
| 19 || May 11 || Cardinals || 3–3 (7) ||  ||  || — || 29,315 || 9–9
|- bgcolor="ccffcc"
| 20 || May 15 || Dodgers || 7–3 || Bahr (3–1) || Lombardi || Bonham (2) || 13,471 || 10–9
|- bgcolor="ffbbbb"
| 21 || May 16 || Dodgers || 1–3 || Branca || Higbe (0–2) || Casey || 34,184 || 10–10
|- bgcolor="ccffcc"
| 22 || May 17 || Dodgers || 4–0 || Ostermueller (3–1) || Melton || — || 17,673 || 11–10
|- bgcolor="ccffcc"
| 23 || May 18 || Giants || 7–6 || Singleton (1–0) || Trinkle || — ||  || 12–10
|- bgcolor="ffbbbb"
| 24 || May 18 || Giants || 6–11 (7) || Thompson || Strincevich (1–2) || Ayers || 32,996 || 12–11
|- bgcolor="ccffcc"
| 25 || May 20 || Braves || 4–3 (10) || Bonham (2–0) || Karl || — || 37,175 || 13–11
|- bgcolor="ffbbbb"
| 26 || May 22 || @ Cardinals || 1–4 || Pollet || Higbe (0–3) || — || 14,035 || 13–12
|- bgcolor="ffbbbb"
| 27 || May 23 || @ Cardinals || 0–2 || Munger || Roe (1–2) || — || 12,722 || 13–13
|- bgcolor="ffbbbb"
| 28 || May 25 || @ Cardinals || 5–10 || Brazle || Behrman (0–2) || — ||  || 13–14
|- bgcolor="ccffcc"
| 29 || May 25 || @ Cardinals || 2–1 || Ostermueller (4–1) || Hearn || — || 26,817 || 14–14
|- bgcolor="ccffcc"
| 30 || May 26 || @ Reds || 5–1 || Higbe (1–3) || Walters || Herring (1) || 19,967 || 15–14
|- bgcolor="ffbbbb"
| 31 || May 27 || @ Reds || 1–6 || Blackwell || Bahr (3–2) || — || 2,974 || 15–15
|- bgcolor="ccffcc"
| 32 || May 28 || Cubs || 7–6 || Herring (1–0) || Kush || — || 30,339 || 16–15
|- bgcolor="ccffcc"
| 33 || May 30 || Cubs || 2–1 (10) || Roe (2–2) || Erickson || — ||  || 17–15
|- bgcolor="ffbbbb"
| 34 || May 30 || Cubs || 2–5 || Borowy || Higbe (1–4) || — || 37,451 || 17–16
|- bgcolor="ffbbbb"
| 35 || May 31 || @ Giants || 9–10 || Trinkle || Herring (1–1) || — || 32,905 || 17–17
|-

|- bgcolor="ffbbbb"
| 36 || June 1 || @ Braves || 0–2 || Sain || Bahr (3–3) || — ||  || 17–18
|- bgcolor="ffbbbb"
| 37 || June 1 || @ Braves || 7–8 (10) || Cooper || Bagby (0–1) || — || 30,656 || 17–19
|- bgcolor="ccffcc"
| 38 || June 2 || @ Braves || 4–3 || Sewell (3–1) || Johnson || Herring (2) || 5,831 || 18–19
|- bgcolor="ffbbbb"
| 39 || June 3 || @ Dodgers || 6–11 || Barney || Higbe (1–5) || Casey ||  || 18–20
|- bgcolor="ffbbbb"
| 40 || June 3 || @ Dodgers || 7–8 || Barney || Roe (2–3) || — || 27,244 || 18–21
|- bgcolor="ffbbbb"
| 41 || June 4 || @ Dodgers || 4–9 || Branca || Singleton (1–1) || — || 32,287 || 18–22
|- bgcolor="ffbbbb"
| 42 || June 5 || @ Dodgers || 0–3 || Taylor || Ostermueller (4–2) || — || 24,977 || 18–23
|- bgcolor="ffbbbb"
| 43 || June 6 || @ Phillies || 3–4 || Schmidt || Herring (1–2) || — || 12,421 || 18–24
|- bgcolor="ffbbbb"
| 44 || June 8 || @ Phillies || 2–5 || Leonard || Strincevich (1–3) || — ||  || 18–25
|- bgcolor="ccffcc"
| 45 || June 8 || @ Phillies || 5–4 || Bonham (3–0) || Donnelly || — || 18,551 || 19–25
|- bgcolor="ffbbbb"
| 46 || June 9 || @ Giants || 10–13 || Jansen || Herring (1–3) || — || 13,069 || 19–26
|- bgcolor="ffbbbb"
| 47 || June 10 || @ Giants || 2–3 (12) || Thompson || Bonham (3–1) || — || 39,690 || 19–27
|- bgcolor="ccffcc"
| 48 || June 11 || @ Giants || 8–7 || Ostermueller (5–2) || Beggs || Higbe (1) || 13,222 || 20–27
|- bgcolor="ffbbbb"
| 49 || June 12 || Cubs || 3–7 || Erickson || Bahr (3–4) || Schmitz || 32,132 || 20–28
|- bgcolor="ffbbbb"
| 50 || June 13 || Braves || 2–6 || Barrett || Sewell (3–2) || — || 6,314 || 20–29
|- bgcolor="ffbbbb"
| 51 || June 15 || Braves || 4–13 || Spahn || Strincevich (1–4) || — ||  || 20–30
|- bgcolor="ffbbbb"
| 52 || June 15 || Braves || 3–12 || Sain || Roe (2–4) || — || 29,062 || 20–31
|- bgcolor="ffbbbb"
| 53 || June 18 || Giants || 5–12 || Jansen || Ostermueller (5–3) || — || 3,661 || 20–32
|- bgcolor="ccffcc"
| 54 || June 19 || Giants || 12–2 || Higbe (2–5) || Cooper || — || 8,779 || 21–32
|- bgcolor="ccffcc"
| 55 || June 20 || Phillies || 6–0 || Bonham (4–1) || Rowe || — || 27,683 || 22–32
|- bgcolor="ffbbbb"
| 56 || June 21 || Phillies || 1–5 || Leonard || Bagby (0–2) || — || 11,144 || 22–33
|- bgcolor="ffbbbb"
| 57 || June 22 || Phillies || 3–4 (13) || Jurisich || Higbe (2–6) || Mauney || 25,392 || 22–34
|- bgcolor="ffbbbb"
| 58 || June 24 || Dodgers || 2–4 || Branca || Ostermueller (5–4) || — || 35,331 || 22–35
|- bgcolor="ffbbbb"
| 59 || June 25 || Dodgers || 2–6 || Taylor || Higbe (2–7) || — || 10,313 || 22–36
|- bgcolor="ccffcc"
| 60 || June 26 || @ Cubs || 8–0 || Bonham (5–1) || Lade || — || 10,654 || 23–36
|- bgcolor="ccffcc"
| 61 || June 27 || @ Cubs || 12–8 || Bagby (1–2) || Lee || Higbe (2) || 9,725 || 24–36
|- bgcolor="ffbbbb"
| 62 || June 28 || @ Cubs || 2–6 || Meyer || Roe (2–5) || — ||  || 24–37
|- bgcolor="ffbbbb"
| 63 || June 28 || @ Cubs || 5–6 || Lade || Wolff (0–1) || — || 37,111 || 24–38
|- bgcolor="ccffcc"
| 64 || June 29 || @ Cubs || 10–4 || Higbe (3–7) || Passeau || — || 27,385 || 25–38
|-

|- bgcolor="ffbbbb"
| 65 || July 1 || Cardinals || 1–2 || Hearn || Bonham (5–2) || — || 37,844 || 25–39
|- bgcolor="ffbbbb"
| 66 || July 2 || Reds || 6–8 || Gumbert || Ostermueller (5–5) || — || 23,384 || 25–40
|- bgcolor="ccffcc"
| 67 || July 3 || Reds || 7–3 || Bagby (2–2) || Hetki || — || 8,610 || 26–40
|- bgcolor="ffbbbb"
| 68 || July 4 || @ Reds || 0–8 || Blackwell || Roe (2–6) || — ||  || 26–41
|- bgcolor="ffbbbb"
| 69 || July 4 || @ Reds || 4–6 || Gumbert || Bahr (3–5) || — || 19,282 || 26–42
|- bgcolor="ffbbbb"
| 70 || July 5 || Cubs || 3–4 || Lade || Sewell (3–3) || — || 12,340 || 26–43
|- bgcolor="ccffcc"
| 71 || July 6 || Cubs || 6–2 || Bonham (6–2) || Erickson || Higbe (3) ||  || 27–43
|- bgcolor="ccffcc"
| 72 || July 6 || Cubs || 10–0 || Ostermueller (6–5) || Meyer || — || 25,776 || 28–43
|- bgcolor="ffbbbb"
| 73 || July 10 || @ Phillies || 2–7 || Leonard || Bagby (2–3) || — || 12,044 || 28–44
|- bgcolor="ffbbbb"
| 74 || July 10 || @ Phillies || 1–2 || Hughes || Higbe (3–8) || — || 12,044 || 28–45
|- bgcolor="ccffcc"
| 75 || July 11 || @ Phillies || 7–2 || Bonham (7–2) || Schanz || — || 12,670 || 29–45
|- bgcolor="ffbbbb"
| 76 || July 12 || @ Phillies || 2–4 || Rowe || Sewell (3–4) || Donnelly || 8,035 || 29–46
|- bgcolor="ccffcc"
| 77 || July 13 || @ Giants || 6–3 || Ostermueller (7–5) || Cooper || — ||  || 30–46
|- bgcolor="ffbbbb"
| 78 || July 13 || @ Giants || 1–3 || Jansen || Roe (2–7) || — || 30,166 || 30–47
|- bgcolor="ffbbbb"
| 79 || July 14 || @ Giants || 1–5 || Hartung || Higbe (3–9) || — || 8,631 || 30–48
|- bgcolor="ccffcc"
| 80 || July 15 || @ Dodgers || 12–4 || Roe (3–7) || Taylor || — ||  || 31–48
|- bgcolor="ccffcc"
| 81 || July 15 || @ Dodgers || 9–3 || Bagby (3–3) || Hatten || — || 25,594 || 32–48
|- bgcolor="ffbbbb"
| 82 || July 16 || @ Dodgers || 6–10 || Behrman || Bonham (7–3) || Taylor || 27,756 || 32–49
|- bgcolor="ccffcc"
| 83 || July 17 || @ Dodgers || 7–1 || Queen (1–0) || King || — || 9,133 || 33–49
|- bgcolor="ccffcc"
| 84 || July 18 || @ Braves || 2–1 || Higbe (4–9) || Voiselle || — || 19,628 || 34–49
|- bgcolor="ffbbbb"
| 85 || July 19 || @ Braves || 0–2 || Sain || Roe (3–8) || — || 22,584 || 34–50
|- bgcolor="ccffcc"
| 86 || July 20 || @ Braves || 9–1 || Ostermueller (8–5) || Spahn || — || 15,675 || 35–50
|- bgcolor="ffbbbb"
| 87 || July 21 || Phillies || 1–8 || Leonard || Wolff (0–2) || — || 12,631 || 35–51
|- bgcolor="ccffcc"
| 88 || July 23 || Phillies || 6–2 || Bonham (8–3) || Jurisich || — || 27,563 || 36–51
|- bgcolor="ccffcc"
| 89 || July 24 || Phillies || 8–6 || Sewell (4–4) || Schmidt || — || 12,631 || 37–51
|- bgcolor="ccffcc"
| 90 || July 24 || Phillies || 3–2 || Higbe (5–9) || Rowe || Roe (1) || 15,433 || 38–51
|- bgcolor="ffbbbb"
| 91 || July 25 || Dodgers || 1–4 || Taylor || Queen (1–1) || — || 42,014 || 38–52
|- bgcolor="ffbbbb"
| 92 || July 26 || Dodgers || 4–6 || Casey || Strincevich (1–5) || — || 17,606 || 38–53
|- bgcolor="ffbbbb"
| 93 || July 27 || Dodgers || 4–8 || Behrman || Ostermueller (8–6) || Casey ||  || 38–54
|- bgcolor="ffbbbb"
| 94 || July 27 || Dodgers || 4–11 (7) || Gregg || Higbe (5–10) || — || 42,716 || 38–55
|- bgcolor="ccffcc"
| 95 || July 29 || Braves || 6–5 || Bonham (9–3) || Voiselle || — || 20,186 || 39–55
|- bgcolor="ccffcc"
| 96 || July 30 || Braves || 5–3 || Higbe (6–10) || Barrett || — || 12,672 || 40–55
|- bgcolor="ffbbbb"
| 97 || July 30 || Braves || 5–8 || Wright || Roe (3–9) || Karl || 12,672 || 40–56
|-

|- bgcolor="ffbbbb"
| 98 || August 1 || Giants || 1–2 || Koslo || Queen (1–2) || — || 28,855 || 40–57
|- bgcolor="ffbbbb"
| 99 || August 2 || Giants || 2–10 || Jansen || Wolff (0–3) || — ||  || 40–58
|- bgcolor="ccffcc"
| 100 || August 2 || Giants || 5–4 || Ostermueller (9–6) || Iott || — || 19,196 || 41–58
|- bgcolor="ffbbbb"
| 101 || August 3 || Giants || 8–11 || Kennedy || Roe (3–10) || Trinkle ||  || 41–59
|- bgcolor="ffffff"
| 102 || August 3 || Giants || 6–6 (8) ||  ||  || — || 26,490 || 41–59
|- bgcolor="ffbbbb"
| 103 || August 4 || Reds || 4–7 || Walters || Bonham (9–4) || Gumbert || 19,883 || 41–60
|- bgcolor="ccffcc"
| 104 || August 5 || Reds || 12–4 || Queen (2–2) || Lively || Higbe (4) || 6,229 || 42–60
|- bgcolor="ccffcc"
| 105 || August 6 || @ Cubs || 7–2 || Wolff (1–3) || Erickson || — || 9,086 || 43–60
|- bgcolor="ccffcc"
| 106 || August 7 || @ Cubs || 3–0 || Higbe (7–10) || Borowy || — || 7,766 || 44–60
|- bgcolor="ffbbbb"
| 107 || August 8 || @ Cardinals || 0–6 || Munger || Ostermueller (9–7) || — || 21,872 || 44–61
|- bgcolor="ccffcc"
| 108 || August 9 || @ Cardinals || 5–4 || Higbe (8–10) || Pollet || — || 20,320 || 45–61
|- bgcolor="ffbbbb"
| 109 || August 10 || @ Cardinals || 0–5 || Dickson || Roe (3–11) || — ||  || 45–62
|- bgcolor="ffbbbb"
| 110 || August 10 || @ Cardinals || 5–7 || Burkhart || Bonham (9–5) || Dickson || 25,482 || 45–63
|- bgcolor="ffbbbb"
| 111 || August 11 || @ Reds || 3–8 || Walters || Wolff (1–4) || — || 12,832 || 45–64
|- bgcolor="ccffcc"
| 112 || August 12 || @ Reds || 3–2 (12) || Lyons (1–0) || Peterson || — || 5,730 || 46–64
|- bgcolor="ccffcc"
| 113 || August 13 || Cubs || 10–2 || Queen (3–2) || Erickson || Bonham (3) || 5,111 || 47–64
|- bgcolor="ccffcc"
| 114 || August 14 || Cardinals || 5–3 || Ostermueller (10–7) || Dickson || — || 19,197 || 48–64
|- bgcolor="ffbbbb"
| 115 || August 15 || Cardinals || 4–7 || Munger || Bonham (9–6) || Wilks || 35,344 || 48–65
|- bgcolor="ccffcc"
| 116 || August 16 || Cardinals || 12–7 || Bagby (4–3) || Burkhart || — || 6,435 || 49–65
|- bgcolor="ffbbbb"
| 117 || August 17 || Cardinals || 5–6 || Hearn || Higbe (8–11) || Brazle || 36,000 || 49–66
|- bgcolor="ffbbbb"
| 118 || August 19 || @ Braves || 5–7 || Lanfranconi || Lyons (1–1) || — || 23,192 || 49–67
|- bgcolor="ccffcc"
| 119 || August 20 || @ Braves || 16–10 || Ostermueller (11–7) || Sain || — || 24,638 || 50–67
|- bgcolor="ffbbbb"
| 120 || August 21 || @ Giants || 1–4 || Hartung || Higbe (8–12) || — || 20,700 || 50–68
|- bgcolor="ffbbbb"
| 121 || August 22 || @ Giants || 7–8 || Trinkle || Lyons (1–2) || Beggs || 8,773 || 50–69
|- bgcolor="ccffcc"
| 122 || August 23 || @ Giants || 11–10 || Bagby (5–3) || Beggs || Higbe (5) ||  || 51–69
|- bgcolor="ccffcc"
| 123 || August 23 || @ Giants || 4–0 || Roe (4–11) || Hansen || — || 32,211 || 52–69
|- bgcolor="ffbbbb"
| 124 || August 24 || @ Dodgers || 1–3 || Branca || Bonham (9–7) || Casey || 33,207 || 52–70
|- bgcolor="ffbbbb"
| 125 || August 25 || @ Dodgers || 10–11 || King || Higbe (8–13) || Casey ||  || 52–71
|- bgcolor="ccffcc"
| 126 || August 26 || @ Dodgers || 16–3 || Ostermueller (12–7) || Gregg || — || 24,069 || 53–71
|- bgcolor="ffbbbb"
| 127 || August 27 || @ Phillies || 3–4 || Leonard || Queen (3–3) || — || 7,537 || 53–72
|- bgcolor="ffbbbb"
| 128 || August 28 || @ Phillies || 0–7 || Rowe || Singleton (1–2) || — || 8,202 || 53–73
|- bgcolor="ccffcc"
| 129 || August 30 || @ Cubs || 8–5 || Bonham (10–7) || Erickson || Roe (2) || 27,523 || 54–73
|- bgcolor="ffbbbb"
| 130 || August 31 || @ Cubs || 3–6 || Lade || Strincevich (1–6) || — || 22,925 || 54–74
|-

|- bgcolor="ffbbbb"
| 131 || September 1 || @ Cardinals || 5–6 (10) || Dickson || Ostermueller (12–8) || — ||  || 54–75
|- bgcolor="ffbbbb"
| 132 || September 1 || @ Cardinals || 2–8 || Hearn || Roe (4–12) || — || 30,095 || 54–76
|- bgcolor="ffbbbb"
| 133 || September 3 || Reds || 6–13 || Blackwell || Higbe (8–14) || — || 37,299 || 54–77
|- bgcolor="ffbbbb"
| 134 || September 4 || Reds || 5–7 || Gumbert || Queen (3–4) || — || 3,682 || 54–78
|- bgcolor="ccffcc"
| 135 || September 6 || Cubs || 7–6 (10) || Sewell (5–4) || Erickson || — || 6,037 || 55–78
|- bgcolor="ffbbbb"
| 136 || September 7 || Cubs || 3–4 || Lade || Higbe (8–15) || — || 11,930 || 55–79
|- bgcolor="ffbbbb"
| 137 || September 8 || Giants || 8–10 || Trinkle || Bagby (5–4) || — || 3,936 || 55–80
|- bgcolor="ffbbbb"
| 138 || September 9 || Giants || 1–3 || Hartung || Roe (4–13) || — || 20,008 || 55–81
|- bgcolor="ffbbbb"
| 139 || September 10 || Giants || 2–3 || Jansen || Queen (3–5) || — || 3,557 || 55–82
|- bgcolor="ccffcc"
| 140 || September 11 || Braves || 4–3 (13) || Higbe (9–15) || Sain || — || 7,010 || 56–82
|- bgcolor="ccffcc"
| 141 || September 11 || Braves || 10–8 || Singleton (2–2) || Lanfranconi || — || 7,010 || 57–82
|- bgcolor="ccffcc"
| 142 || September 12 || Braves || 4–3 || Sewell (6–4) || Barrett || — || 21,012 || 58–82
|- bgcolor="ffbbbb"
| 143 || September 13 || Braves || 1–8 || Johnson || Roe (4–14) || — || 10,721 || 58–83
|- bgcolor="ffbbbb"
| 144 || September 14 || Phillies || 3–7 || Leonard || Bonham (10–8) || — ||  || 58–84
|- bgcolor="ffbbbb"
| 145 || September 14 || Phillies || 7–9 || Rowe || Queen (3–6) || — || 24,279 || 58–85
|- bgcolor="ccffcc"
| 146 || September 15 || Phillies || 12–2 || Higbe (10–15) || Hughes || — || 2,833 || 59–85
|- bgcolor="ffbbbb"
| 147 || September 16 || Phillies || 1–2 || Donnelly || Queen (3–7) || — || 2,568 || 59–86
|- bgcolor="ffbbbb"
| 148 || September 17 || Dodgers || 2–4 || Gregg || Ostermueller (12–9) || Behrman || 33,916 || 59–87
|- bgcolor="ccffcc"
| 149 || September 18 || Dodgers || 8–7 || Higbe (11–15) || King || — || 15,440 || 60–87
|- bgcolor="ffbbbb"
| 150 || September 21 || @ Reds || 1–3 || Blackwell || Higbe (11–16) || — ||  || 60–88
|- bgcolor="ccffcc"
| 151 || September 21 || @ Reds || 11–7 (8) || Nagy (1–2) || Gumbert || — || 15,975 || 61–88
|- bgcolor="ffbbbb"
| 152 || September 23 || Cardinals || 4–8 || Hearn || Ostermueller (12–10) || Wilks || 10,330 || 61–89
|- bgcolor="ffbbbb"
| 153 || September 24 || Cardinals || 1–5 || Munger || Roe (4–15) || — || 11,658 || 61–90
|- bgcolor="ffbbbb"
| 154 || September 25 || Cardinals || 3–15 || Dickson || Higbe (11–17) || — || 7,155 || 61–91
|- bgcolor="ffbbbb"
| 155 || September 25 || Cardinals || 1–3 || Staley || Nagy (1–3) || — || 7,155 || 61–92
|- bgcolor="ccffcc"
| 156 || September 28 || Reds || 7–0 || Bonham (11–8) || Lively || — || 33,704 || 62–92
|-

|-
| Legend:       = Win       = Loss       = TieBold = Pirates team member

Opening Day lineup

Notable transactions 
 July 23, 1947: Frank Thomas was signed as an amateur free agent by the Pirates.
 September 23, 1947: Joe Grace was selected off waivers by the Pirates from the Washington Senators.

Roster

Player stats

Batting

Starters by position 
Note: Pos = Position; G = Games played; AB = At bats; H = Hits; Avg. = Batting average; HR = Home runs; RBI = Runs batted in

Other batters 
Note: G = Games played; AB = At bats; H = Hits; Avg. = Batting average; HR = Home runs; RBI = Runs batted in

Pitching

Starting pitchers 
Note: G = Games pitched; IP = Innings pitched; W = Wins; L = Losses; ERA = Earned run average; SO = Strikeouts

Other pitchers 
Note: G = Games pitched; IP = Innings pitched; W = Wins; L = Losses; ERA = Earned run average; SO = Strikeouts

Relief pitchers 
Note: G = Games pitched; W = Wins; L = Losses; SV = Saves; ERA = Earned run average; SO = Strikeouts

Farm system

Notes

References 
 1947 Pittsburgh Pirates team at Baseball-Reference
 1947 Pittsburgh Pirates at Baseball Almanac

Pittsburgh Pirates seasons
Pittsburgh Pirates season
Pittsburg Pir